Wahayati Andak is the debut album of the Lebanese singer Nawal Al Zoghbi.

Track listing
 "Wehyati Andak" (Lyrics: Elie Bitar; Music: Georges Mardidossian)
 "Ahleflak Bel-Hob" (Lyrics: Salah Gohar; Music: Samir Sfeir)
 "Khoudni Maak" 
 "Iddamak Hallayn"
 "Al-Dabki Lakini"
 "Sarakni Hanini"

References

1992 debut albums
Arabic-language albums
Nawal Al Zoghbi albums